The Leonard D. White prize, supported by the University of Chicago is awarded yearly for the best dissertation in the field of public administration. It is named after historian Leonard D. White

Winners

External links
 List of award recipients (1959-) at American Political Science Association

Academic awards